Tappe Mil ( or the Fire Temple of Rey , Fire Temple of Bahram ) is one of the historical religious places in Rey, Iran which has stood since the Sasanian Empire. It is named after Bahram V.

Geographical location 
About 12 kilometers southeast of Ray city towards Varamin, on the top of a wide hill in the city of Ghalenou, there are the remains of a palace or fire temple, which is known as tappe mil "pillar Hill", and it is built on two big foundations, which looks like Mil from a distance. Mil (Persian: میل) is a word in Persian language, which in architecture refers to a special narrow and tall building that was common in the past.

Architecture 
The direction of the building is east and west, and there was a iwan "porch" (Persian: ایوان) with four circular columns on the east front. A part of the fire temple was destroyed during Alexander's attack on Iran, and only a part of the chahartaq "four-arched"  and beautiful structure of this fire temple remained in the form of two pillars.

Excavations and renovation 
For the first time in 1913, the French "Jacques de Morgan" restored this fire temple and the surrounding structures. This building was explored and excavated in 1933 by an American archaeologist named Eric Schmidt, and recently Firouzeh Shibani from Iran followed up its excavation work.

See also
 Verethragna

References

External links
 Photoes in Persian Wikipedia

Sasanian architecture
Buildings and structures in Tehran

Fire temples in Iran
National works of Iran
Chahartaqis